

Revolvers

Semi-automatic pistols

Bolt-action rifles

     # Also used by some Commonwealth parties

Semi-automatic rifles

Submachine guns

Light machine guns

See also
List of common World War II infantry weapons
List of World War II firearms of Germany
Table of handgun and rifle cartridges
List of rifle cartridges
List of handgun cartridges

World War II infantry weapons